Loddefjord is an urban settlement in the borough of Laksevåg in the municipality of Bergen in Vestland county, Norway. Loddefjord consists mainly of high- and low-rise flats revolving around the local shopping mall.

Informally, the area is sometimes referred to as "Loddikken".

References

Villages in Vestland
Neighbourhoods of Bergen